Omkar Verma (born 23 October 1991) is an Indian cricketer. He made his List A debut for Chhattisgarh in the 2016–17 Vijay Hazare Trophy on 3 March 2017. He made his first-class debut for Chhattisgarh in the 2018–19 Ranji Trophy on 1 November 2018.

References

External links
 

1991 births
Living people
Indian cricketers
Chhattisgarh cricketers
Place of birth missing (living people)